Sandy Creek is a tributary of the Tuscarawas River, 41.3 miles (66.5 km) long, in northeastern Ohio. Via the Tuscarawas, Muskingum and Ohio Rivers, it is part of the watershed of the Mississippi River, draining an area of 503 square miles (1,303 km²).

Geography 
Sandy Creek rises in Hanover Township, approximately two miles (3 km) northeast of Hanoverton in western Columbiana County and flows generally west-southwestwardly through northwestern Carroll County, southeastern Stark County and northeastern Tuscarawas County, past the communities of Kensington, Minerva, Malvern, Waynesburg and Magnolia. It joins the Tuscarawas River from the east in Bethlehem Township in Stark County, approximately one mile (2 km) northeast of Bolivar. At Minerva, it collects the Still Fork. At Waynesburg it collects a short stream known as Little Sandy Creek. In Sandyville, Tuscarawas County it collects Nimishillen Creek, which drains the city of Canton.

A dry dam, Bolivar Dam, constructed by the United States Army Corps of Engineers, spans the creek near its mouth.

Flow rate
At the United States Geological Survey's stream gauge in Waynesburg, the annual mean flow of the river between 1939 and 2005 was 278 ft³/s (8 m³/s). The highest recorded flow during the period was 15,000 ft³/s (425 m³/s) on January 22, 1959. The lowest recorded flow was 6.9 ft³/s (0 m³/s) on an unspecified date.

Variant names
According to the Geographic Names Information System, Sandy Creek has also been known historically as:
Big Sandy Creek
Big Sandy River
Elks Eye Creek
Lamanshicolas Creek
Lamenshikola Creek

See also
List of rivers of Ohio

References

Rivers of Ohio
Muskingum River
Rivers of Carroll County, Ohio
Rivers of Columbiana County, Ohio
Rivers of Stark County, Ohio
Rivers of Tuscarawas County, Ohio